The Transmitter Kojál (also known as Morava transmitter) is a facility for FM- and TV-transmission at Kojál Hill near Brno in the Czech Republic. Its aerial mast is a 340-metre-high guyed mast.  Mast is third tallest structure in the Czech Republic.

Mast was built as replacement of 324 metre tall guyed mast, built of lattice steel in 1959/60. This mast, which had a triangular cross section, was anchored in 4 levels, which were situated 63.75 metres, 135 metres, 213.75 metres and 292.5 metres above ground. In a height of 300 metres, it had a cabin with rooms for measurements. On this there was the antenna mast with antennas for FM (lower part) and TV (upper part) broadcasting.

See also
List of masts

References

External links
 http://www.dxradio-ffm.de/Brno-Kojal_X.jpg
 http://www.skyscraperpage.com/cities/?buildingID=55510
 http://www.skyscraperpage.com/cities/?buildingID=55511
 
 

Towers in the Czech Republic
Radio masts and towers in Europe
Towers completed in 1960
1960 establishments in Czechoslovakia
20th-century architecture in the Czech Republic